The 1993 Continental Grass Court Championships was an ATP-tennis tournament held in Rosmalen, Netherlands and was played on outdoor grass courts. It was the fourth edition of the tournament and was held from June 7 through June 13, 1993. Arnaud Boetsch won the singles title.

Finals

Singles

 Arnaud Boetsch defeated  Wally Masur 3–6, 6–3, 6–3

Doubles

 Jonathan Stark /  Patrick McEnroe defeated  David Adams /  Andrei Olhovskiy 7–6, 1–6, 6–4

References

External links
 ITF tournament edition details
 

Rosmalen Grass Court Championships
Ordina Open
Rosmalen Grass Court Championships